The Metro Ligero ("Light Metro") is a light rail system in Madrid, Spain. It has three lines, totaling , and 37 stations.

Lines

Line ML-1

Both termini offer connections to lines of the Madrid Metro. The only above-ground stations are Antonio Saura, Álvarez de Villaamil, Palas de Rey, and Las Tablas. Line ML-1 serves the new neighbourhoods of Sanchinarro and Las Tablas, in the Fuencarral district.

Line ML-2

Line ML-2 opened on 27 July 2007, between Colonia Jardín and Estación de Aravaca in the neighbourhood of Aravaca, in the western communities of Boadilla del Monte and Pozuelo de Alarcón. They are Colonia Jardín, Somosaguas Sur, and Avenida de Europa. Line ML-2 also serves the Complutense University of Madrid. As part of the project, provision has been made for a future station at Prado de las Bodegas, which is subject to further development. The station will also provide a connection to the planned Metro Ligero Line ML-4, to Estación de Las Rozas.

Line ML-3

The two are Colonia Jardín and Montepríncipe (which is in an open cut between two separate tunnels). Line ML-3 serves Ciudad de la Imagen, an employment centre with an audiovisual theme, and ends in Boadilla del Monte. The first  of track are shared with Line ML-2. As with Line ML-2, Line ML-3 serves the western suburbs of Madrid. Both lines are in a special fare zone designated as "Metro Ligero Oeste". Provision has been made for three additional stations on the line: Retamares Oeste, Ciudad Financiera Este, and Ciudad Financiera Oeste. None of the three are scheduled to open until further development takes place.

Line ML-4

The Parla Tram is also known as ML-4.

Future projects

A new Metro Ligero line, Line ML-4, is proposed from the new station Prado de las Bodegas on Line ML-2 to Estación de Las Rozas, with a connection to Cercanías trains. The line would serve the Hospital Puerta de Hierro.
A tramway is also proposed for the southern suburb of Valdemoro, which would connect the Cercanías railway station and the Infanta Elena Hospital. Both were expected to open by 2011.
Lines ML-2 and ML-3 are expected to be extended from Colonia Jardín to Aluche by 2020.

Rolling stock
The three Metro Ligero lines are operated by a fleet of 70 low-floor Alstom Citadis model 302 trams. Unlike the Madrid Metro, trams operate on the right.

The Citadis 302 model as used on the Metro Ligero is similar to those used by the Parla Tram in the southern suburb of Parla. However, those used on the Metro Ligero are painted red and blue, while the trams used in Parla are lime green.

Car 153 was loaned to Buenos Aires starting in 2008 for use on the Tranvía del Este demonstration tram service at Puerto Madero.

In May 2009, six (165-170) were sold to TransAdelaide for use on the Glenelg line in Adelaide, Australia. In December 2017, Adelaide received a further three (150, 154, 155).

Gallery

Network map

See also
 Madrid Metro
 List of tram and light rail transit systems
 :Category:Madrid Metro Ligero stations

References

External links

 Metro Ligeros de Madrid – official site (archive) 

Madrid, Metro Ligero
Madrid Metro
Rail transport in Madrid
Railway lines opened in 2007
2007 establishments in Spain